Hecla is the traditional English spelling of the Icelandic volcano, Hekla,  and may also refer to:

Places 
 Fury and Hecla Strait, Nunavut, Canada
 Hecla, Kentucky, USA
 Hecla, Missouri, USA
 Hecla, Montana, USA

 Hecla Iron Works Building, Brooklyn, NY, USA
 Hecla, South Dakota, USA
 Hecla, Wyoming, USA, a ghost town near Laramie
 Hecla and Fury Islands, Nunavut, Canada
 Hecla and Griper Bay, Nunavut and Northwest Territories, Canada
 Hecla-Grindstone Provincial Park, Manitoba, Canada
 Hecla (South Uist), a 606 m mountain on the island of South Uist, Scotland

Ships 
 Hecla-class bomb vessel
 Hecla-class survey vessel
 HMS Hecla, various

Other uses 
 Hecla Mining, Idaho based mining company
 Calumet and Hecla Mining Company, Michigan, USA
 Calumet & Hecla Band

See also
 Hekla